Thair Jassam Homi (born 31 December 1959) is a coach and former Iraqi football player, also a coach.

Jassam signed to manage Al-Najaf in the Iraqi premier league in November 9 of 2018, and is still leading the Najaf city team.

Managerial statistics

Honours

Club
Al-Faisaly SC (Amman)
Jordan FA Shield: 2011
Jordan FA Shield: 2009
2009 Tishreen Cup
Al-Wehdat SC
Jordan FA Cup: 2009-2010
Al-Shorta
Iraqi Premier League: 2012–13

References

Iraqi footballers
Iraq international footballers
Al-Shorta SC managers
Living people
1959 births
Association footballers not categorized by position
Al-Faisaly SC managers
Expatriate football managers in Jordan
Iraqi football managers